Hanson House is located at 704 Ste. Catherine, in Florissant, Missouri.  The house was built in 1897, and is significant for its architecture.  It was added to the National Register of Historic Places in 1979.

References

Houses on the National Register of Historic Places in Missouri
Houses completed in 1897
Houses in St. Louis County, Missouri
National Register of Historic Places in St. Louis County, Missouri